Michael Slocum (born 18 March 1965) is an Irish Gaelic football coach and former player. He was an All-Ireland-winner at club level with St Finbarr's and at senior inter-county level with the Cork county team.

Career
Slocum first came to prominence at underage level with St Finbarr's, the club with which he eventually won the All-Ireland Club Championship title during a successful senior career. He first appeared on the inter-county scene as captain of the Cork minor team that lost the 1983 All-Ireland minor final to Derry, before winning three successive All-Ireland Under-21 Championship titles. Slocum subsequently joined the Cork senior football team and won the first of four successive Munster Championship titles in his debut season in 1987. He later added a National League title to his collection before claiming successive All-Ireland medals at right wing-back in 1989 and 1990. An All-Star-winner for the latter victory, Slocum also served as a coach an club and inter-county levels.

Honours
St Finbarr's
All-Ireland Senior Club Football Championship: 1987
Munster Senior Club Football Championship: 1986
Cork Senior Football Championship: 1985
Cork Under-21 Football Championship: 1985, 1986
Cork Minor Football Championship: 1982, 1983

Cork
All-Ireland Senior Football Championship: 1989, 1990
Munster Senior Football Championship: 1987, 1988, 1989, 1990
National Football League: 1988-89
All-Ireland Under-21 Football Championship: 1984, 1985, 1986
Munster Under-21 Football Championship: 1984, 1985, 1986
Munster Minor Football Championship: 1983 (c)

References

1965 births
Living people
Cork inter-county Gaelic footballers
Gaelic football coaches
Munster inter-provincial Gaelic footballers
St Finbarr's Gaelic footballers
Winners of two All-Ireland medals (Gaelic football)